Neil E. Putnam (born February 25, 1936) is a former American football player and coach.  He served as the head football coach at Lafayette College  from 1971 to 1980, compiling a record of 44–55–3. Putnam is a native of Youngstown, Ohio.  He played college football at Miami University.

Head coaching record

College

References

1936 births
Living people
Dartmouth Big Green football coaches
Lafayette Leopards football coaches
Miami RedHawks football players
Yale Bulldogs football coaches
Players of American football from Youngstown, Ohio